is a Japanese manga series written and illustrated by Yū Andō. It was serialized in Shueisha's seinen manga magazine Grand Jump from July 2018 to March 2021, with its chapters collected in six tankōbon volumes.

Publication
Written and illustrated by Yū Andō, Strike or Gutter was serialized in Shueisha's seinen manga magazine Grand Jump from July 18, 2018, to March 17, 2021. Shueisha collected its chapters in six tankōbon volumes, released from March 19, 2019, to May 19, 2021.

Volume list

See also
Bowling King

References

External links
 

Bowling in anime and manga
Comedy anime and manga
Seinen manga
Shueisha manga